Varga or Vargha is a Hungarian occupational surname derived from the Hungarian term varga, meaning, ”shoemaker” or “cobbler”.  Czech and Slovak female form is Vargová.

People with the surname “Varga” include:

Academics
 Eugen Varga (1879–1964), Hungarian Marxist economist
 Richard S. Varga (1928–2022), American mathematician

Artists
 Judit Varga (born 1979), Hungarian composer
 Laszlo Varga (cellist), Hungarian-American cellist (retired 2000)
 Marián Varga (1947–2017), Slovak musician and composer
 Margit Varga (1908–2005), American painter, art director, journalist
 Ferenc Varga (sculptor)
 
 
 Frank Varga
 Silvia Vargová

Sportspeople
 Ádám Varga (born 1999), Hungarian footballer
 Béla Varga (wrestler) (1888–1969), Hungarian Olympic wrestler
 Dacian Varga (born 1984), Romanian footballer
 Dániel Varga (born 1983), Hungarian water polo player
 Dénes Varga (born 1987), Hungarian water polo player
 Erik Varga (born 1976), Slovak sports shooter
 Ferenc Varga (1925–2023), Hungarian sprint canoeist
 Gabriel Varga (born 1985), Canadian kickboxer
 János Varga (born 1939), Hungarian wrestler
 József Varga (born 1954), Hungarian footballer
 József Varga (born 1988), Hungarian footballer
 Judit Varga (born 1976), Hungarian athlete
 Katalin Varga (canoeist) (born 1986), Hungarian paracanoeist
 Kevin Varga, Hungarian footballer
 László Varga (footballer) (born 1987), Hungarian footballer
 Miklós Varga (born 1987), Hungarian boxer
 Milan Varga (born 1983), Slovak ice hockey player
 Miroslav Varga, Czech sport shooter
 Norbert Varga (born 1980), Romanian footballer
 Peter Varga (born 1998), Slovak footballer
 Péter Varga (born 1974), Hungarian kickboxer
 Roland Varga (athlete) (born 1967), Hungarian discus thrower
 Roland Varga (footballer) (born 1989), Hungarian footballer
 Stanislav Varga (born 1972), Slovak footballer
 Tamás Varga (born 1975), Hungarian water polo player
 Velimir Varga (born 1980), Slovenian-Croat footballer
 Zsolt Varga (born 1972), Hungarian water polo player who competed in the 1996 and 2000 Summer Olympics
 Zsolt Varga (canoeist), Hungarian sprint canoeist
 Zvonko Varga (born 1959), Serbian footballer

Others
Tammy Varga (1972-Present), Australian resident and the better out of four sisters
 Béla Varga (politician) (1903–1995), Hungarian Catholic priest and politician
 Gabor Varga (1961–2006), Swedish aviator
 István Varga (disambiguation), several people
 Katalin Varga (1802–1852), leader of the Transylvanian Miners' Movement
 Melinda Varga (born 1977), Australian reality TV personality
 Michel Varga (1927–2015), Hungarian Trotskyist activist
 Nacho Varga, a fictional character in Better Call Saul
 V.M. Varga, the main antagonist in the third season of Fargo
 Zoltán Varga (disambiguation), several people

Vargha
Csongor Vargha (born 1946), Hungarian sprint canoeist
Ilona Vargha (1910–1973), Hungarian fencer
János Vargha (born 1949), Hungarian biologist and environmentalist
Ferenc Vargha

Hungarian-language surnames
Occupational surnames